Coimbatore Institute of Engineering and Technology (CIET), is a private self-financing Engineering college located in Coimbatore, Tamil Nadu, India. It was established in 2001 by the Kovai Kalaimagal Educational Trust (KKET). Ample facilities are also provided within the campus for extracurricular activities and for personal development.

Location

Programmes
The college offers the following programmes affiliated to Anna University and AICTE.

UG programmes
 B.E. Artificial Intelligence and Data Science
 B.E. Civil Engineering
 B.E. Computer Science and Engineering
 B.E. Electronics and Communication Engineering
 B.E. Electrical and Electronics Engineering
 B.E. Mechanical Engineering
 B.E. Mechatronics Engineering
 BTech Information Technology

PG programmes
 M.E. Engineering Design
 M.E. Communication Systems
 M.E. Computer Science and Engineering
 M.B.A.

Features
CIET is an Autonomous institution affiliated to Anna University Chennai, approved by AICTE, Accredited with 'A' Grade by NAAC. CIET offers 8 Under Graduate and 3 Post Graduate Engineering courses and 2 Year full time MBA program with Functional and Sectoral specializations. CIET shall strive for the continual improvement in academic performance, professional skill in engineering, better attitude and also ethical values of its students that enhance their eligibility for higher studies and employability.

MISSION
Technical ingenuity is promoted through Excellence in academic achievement, Continuous assessment Seminars and Workshops.

MoU with industry 
CIET has signed an MoU with popular manufacturing companies and Industries in Coimbatore - CPC for industrial placement, providing training, consultancy and project guidance.

See also 
 Anna University
 IoT
 Technology business Incubator
 AICTE
AI and Data Science
UGC
Coimbatore colleges
Xyloinc

References 

Educational institutions established in 2001
Engineering colleges in Coimbatore
2001 establishments in Tamil Nadu
Private universities and colleges